Abisara talantus, the blue Judy, is a butterfly in the family Riodinidae. It is found in Nigeria (south and the Cross River loop) and Cameroon. The habitat consists of primary, dense forests.

References

Butterflies described in 1891
Abisara
Butterflies of Africa